Michael Dean Boggs (born November 8, 1978) is an American Christian musician, guitarist, and worship pastor, who mainly plays Christian pop. His nickname was "Boggsy", while he was with FFH. He was awarded the Dove Award for Songwriter of the Year, in 2012.

Early and personal life
Boggs was born, Michael Dean Boggs, on November 8, 1978, in Tulsa, Oklahoma, where he started playing music by drumming "on pots and pans with pencils", while his father joined in playing a guitar and singing. During his tenure with FFH, he was in the process of obtaining a theology degree. He is married to his girlfriend from Oklahoma, Keely, who is an Oklahoma State University graduate, being a former elementary school teacher. They relocated to Franklin, Tennessee, for her husband to pursue his musical ambitions, where he joined FFH, in 1999. Boggs is currently the worship minister at Kairos Nashville.

Music career
His music career started in 1999, with the band FFH, where he was their guitarist and background vocalist, for eight years from 1999 until 2007, when he commenced his worship leading and individual singing and songwriting career. The subsequent release, an extended play, More Like a Lion, was released on September 24, 2013, by Stylos Records. His second studio album, More Like a Lion, was released on March 25, 2014, with Stylos Records. Boggs was awarded with the Dove Award for Songwriter of the Year, in 2012.

Discography
Studio albums
 More Than Moved (October 19, 2010)
 More Like a Lion (March 24, 2014, Stylos)
EPs
 More Like a Lion (September 24, 2013, Stylos)

References

External links
 Official website

1978 births
Living people
American performers of Christian music
Musicians from Oklahoma
Musicians from Tennessee
Songwriters from Oklahoma
Songwriters from Tennessee